The Magnes Collection of Jewish Art and Life, formerly known as the Judah L. Magnes Museum from 1961 until its reopening in 2012, is a museum of Jewish history, art, and culture in Berkeley, California.  The museum, which was founded in 1961 by Seymour and Rebecca Fromer, is named for Jewish activist Rabbi Judah L. Magnes, a native of Oakland and co-founder of the Hebrew University of Jerusalem. The Magnes Collection of Jewish Art and Life houses more than 30,000 Jewish artifacts and manuscripts, which is the third largest collection of its kind in the United States.

During the 2000s, negotiations were held to potentially merge the Judah L. Magnes Museum with what is now called the Contemporary Jewish Museum of San Francisco. However, the talks failed to produce an agreement to combine the two institutions.

In 2010, the Judah L. Magnes Museum agreed to give its collection to the University of California, Berkeley, which will now display and preserve the museum's rare Jewish artifacts. As part of the agreement, the collection was moved from its location in an 8,600-square-foot house on Russell Street in Berkeley to a 25,000-square-foot building on Allston Way in downtown Berkeley. The Magnes Museum's board of directors had originally purchased the downtown building in 1997.

The museum reopened in its new facility on January 22, 2012. In addition to the move, the name of the museum was changed to the Magnes Collection of Jewish Art and Life.

Facilities
The space available for the museum has grown over time.  Beginning as one room above the Parkway Movie Theater off Lake Merritt in downtown Oakland, the museum eventually expanded and relocated to the former Burke Mansion (architect: Daniel J. Patterson) in Berkeley. The museum's art and artifact collections are now located at 2121 Allston Way in Berkeley, while the Western Jewish Americana archives are held in the Bancroft Library at UC Berkeley.

Exhibitions
My America opened at The Magnes on June 5, 2006. The exhibit was on loan from the Jewish Museum in New York.

Known for promoting the avant-garde since its inception in the early sixties, the Magnes also launched the REVISIONS series of installations, including such artists as Ann Chamberlain, Naomie Kremer, Larry Abramson, Jonathon Keats, Amy Berk, and Shahrokh Yadegari, as guest-curated by Lawrence Rinder.

In September, 2007, They Called Me Mayer July: Painted Memories of Jewish Life in Poland Before the Holocaust opened at the Museum. Mayer July resulted from a collaboration between Barbara Kirshenblatt-Gimblett, a professor of performance studies and folklore at NYU, and her father, Mayer Kirshenblatt, who was born in Poland in 1916. With Barbara's encouragement, Mayer taught himself to paint as a septuagenarian and produced sixty-five paintings chronicling life in the Polish town of Opatów before the Holocaust.

History

Founded by Seymour Fromer and Rebecca Camhi Fromer, the Magnes Museum was dedicated to retrieving and preserving the art and artifacts of Jewish daily life, culture, and religion. Among the numerous artists and artisans whose careers and projects he helped launch and whose crafts he helped preserve:

Deborah Kaufman, who birthed the first Jewish Film Festival;
Vivian Kleiman, a Peabody Award-winning producer of the first professional documentary film on the Jewish Diaspora (''Routes of Exile: A Moroccan Jewish Odyssey);
Lev Liberman and his band, the Klezmorim, the world's first Klezmer revival band;
David Moss who revived the art of Hebrew calligraphy and contemporary Ketubah design;
Victor Ries, a Jewish metalsmith and silversmith whose work includes the entrance gate to the original Magnes Museum property;

Among the projects that Seymour and Rebecca created:
cataloguing the treasure trove of Yiddish records salvaged from dumpsters;
collecting libraries of Yiddish books from the homes of Jewish chicken farmers in Petaluma, CA
retrieving Judaica poised to be discarded as Jewish life in various countries was diminishing, among them Morocco, Tunisia, Egypt, Czechoslovakia, India, and Central Europe.

See also 
 Judah Leon Magnes
 Commission for the Preservation of Pioneer Jewish Cemeteries and Landmarks
Taube Foundation for Jewish Life & Culture

References

External links 
Official site
Western Jewish History Center
Page at NY Jewish Museum on My America exhibit

San Francisco Chronicle article on They Called Me Mayer July

Art in the San Francisco Bay Area
Art museums and galleries in California
Education in Berkeley, California
Institutions accredited by the American Alliance of Museums
Jewish-American history in California
Jewish museums in California
Museums established in 1961
Museums in Berkeley, California
University museums in California
University of California, Berkeley